Nikolay Konstantinovich Cherkasov (14 September 1966) was a Soviet and Russian actor. People's Artist of the USSR (1947).

Career
He was born in Saint Petersburg (later Petrograd in 1914, and Leningrad from 1924 to 1991) into the family of a railway clerk. From 1919 he was a mime artist in Petrograd's Maryinsky Theatre, the Bolshoi Theatre, and elsewhere. After graduating from the Institute of Stage Arts in 1926, he began acting in the Young Spectator's Theatre in Leningrad.

Cherkasov debuted in film with the supporting part of hairdresser Charles in Vladimir Gardin’s Pushkin biopic The Poet and the Tsar (1927). Cherkasov was one of Stalin's favorite actors and played title roles in Sergei Eisenstein's monumental sound films Alexander Nevsky (1938) and Parts I & II of Ivan the Terrible (1945 & 1946; though Part II was not officially released until 1958 for political reasons). He also played Jacques Paganel in the memorable 1936 adaptation of Jules Verne's The Children of Captain Grant. In the 1947 comedy Springtime Cherkasov appeared alongside other icons of Stalinist cinema, Lyubov Orlova and Faina Ranevskaya. For the role of Alexander Popov in the film Alexander Popov in 1951, he received a Stalin Prize of the second degree. In 1957, Cherkasov portrayed Don Quixote in director Grigori Kozintsev's screen adaptation of the novel.

In 1941, Cherkasov was awarded the Stalin Prize; in 1947, he was named a People's Artist of the USSR. He wrote his memoirs, "Notes of a Soviet Actor" in 1951. He died in Leningrad in 1966 and was buried in Tikhvin Cemetery, the "Necropolis of the Masters of Art", at the Alexander Nevsky Lavra.

The image of Cherkasov in the role of Alexander Nevsky is on the Soviet Order of Alexander Nevsky, because there are no known lifetime portraits of Nevsky.

Filmography

References

External links

1903 births
1966 deaths
20th-century Russian male actors
Male actors from Saint Petersburg
People from Sankt-Peterburgsky Uyezd
Russian State Institute of Performing Arts alumni
Third convocation members of the Supreme Soviet of the Soviet Union
Fourth convocation members of the Supreme Soviet of the Soviet Union
Honored Artists of the RSFSR
People's Artists of the RSFSR
People's Artists of the USSR
Stalin Prize winners
Lenin Prize winners
Recipients of the Order of Lenin
Recipients of the Order of the Red Banner of Labour
Russian male actors
Russian male film actors
Russian male silent film actors
Russian male stage actors
Soviet male actors
Soviet male film actors
Soviet male silent film actors
Soviet male stage actors
Burials at Tikhvin Cemetery
Residents of the Benois House